Musa Gibril Bala Gaye (born August 13, 1946), also known as Mousa G. Bala Gaye, is a Gambian politician, economist, banker and diplomat. He had a long career in government service and involvement in banking and business before entering the cabinet as finance minister on September 25, 2003. He served in that position until March 2005. On March 24, 2005 he became foreign minister of the Gambia and served in that position until October 2005. He again became finance minister in November 2005, and served in that position until he was replaced in June 2009 in a major government reshuffle.

References

1946 births
Living people
Labour ministers of the Gambia
Finance ministers of the Gambia
Foreign ministers of the Gambia
Gambian economists